Bubenik or Bubeník (Czech and Slovak feminine: Bubeníková) is a surname and toponym. It means "drummer" in Czech and Slovak.

It may refer to:
 Bubenik (hill) in southeastern Germany
 Matúš Bubeník (born 1989), Slovak athlete
 Wolfgang Bubenik (born 1981), Austrian football player
 Zoltán Bubeník, Czech Surgeon General

See also
 

Czech-language surnames
Slovak-language surnames